Redeemer Lutheran College is a co-educational Lutheran primary and secondary school in Rochedale, Brisbane, Queensland, Australia. Founded in 1980 by Robin Kleinschmidt and other Lutherans in the south of Brisbane, the College currently educates students from years Prep to 12. The Principal of the college is Michael Kleidon  who has served since 2022.

Location and grounds
Redeemer is located in Brisbane City in a semi-rural environment. The College campus has much open space, with no building exceeding two stories in height large path infrastructure crossing the grounds.

Doctrinal emphasis
Redeemer focuses on promoting the Lutheran denomination of the Christian faith; however adherents of any belief or none are accepted. Religious instruction is provided via 150 minutes of "Christian Studies" every week from years 6 to 12, and morning devotions in the chapel and in home rooms.
Staff are expected to uphold a Christian lifestyle, although there is no official definition of that lifestyle, and most staff members are practising Christians. RLC has a chaplaincy service which is responsible for devotions and other expressions of religious life.

Educational standards
Most senior school-leavers score strongly in the Australian Tertiary Admission Rank (ATAR), with roughly 20% of the graduating cohort achieving an ATAR of 90-99.

Extra-curricular
RLC offers sporting opportunities and competition to musical competitions and debating under the auspices of the Queensland Debating Union.
The college has won music competitions such as MusicFest, Queensland Youth Music Awards and the Gold Coast Eisteddfod.
It houses many different music ensembles at varying difficulty. There is a broad selection of Concert Bands, String Orchestras, Choirs, Chamber Ensembles and Jazz Groups.
Sport teams compete in the Greater Brisbane Conference. Redeemer sports Cricket, Touch, Basketball, Volleyball, Netball, AFL, Soccer, and Indoor Cricket, among other sports and physical activity opportunities.

History
The school was founded in 1980 by L. Robin Kleinschmidt, an Australian Lutheran educationalist.  He served as headmaster of St Peters Lutheran College, Brisbane and was responsible in part for encouraging the theatrical talents of a young Sigrid Thornton.

Kleinschmidt served as headmaster of Redeemer College from foundation to 2001 and was responsible for the construction of most of the modern campus. His influence on the school can still be seen, particularly in the field of Debating, where the Inter-House Debating Trophy is known as the Robin Kleinschmidt Trophy. The school's music centre, which was erected in 1999, was renamed the Robin Kleinschmidt centre.

Controversies
Helen Darville made claims in interviews regarding her school experiences that she had been looked down upon for being at the school on a scholarship and also that she had befriended a Croatian girl who had been bullied by other students. The College refuted both claims, demonstrating that it had never had a scholarship program (although limited bursaries existed and continue to exist for already-enrolled students in need) and that there were no students of Croatian ethnicity enrolled at the time of Darville's enrolment. Then-headmaster, L. Robin Kleinschmidt, viewed these claims with contempt many years after the fact, as detailed in his memoirs.

Warren Schneider, a former teacher at the school, was charged, prosecuted, and later convicted of paedophilia. It was proven that events took place on a school camp in 2002, with Schneider providing alcohol to female students and playing sexually charged games of truth or dare with them. Schneider was jailed for 15 months, suspended after 5 months. In a second case in October 2007, Schneider pleaded guilty to three counts of rape and many cases of indecent dealings with students of both Redeemer College and another school at which he had previously taught. The school released a statement advising, "The college sincerely regrets that these events occurred," and stated in a newsletter, "It's been a difficult week for our community in the wake of the conviction of former teacher Warren Schneider." However, the school has not to date issued an apology to the victims of the abuse.

Notable alumni 

 Zac Alexanderprofessional squash player and 2018 Commonwealth Games gold medallist
 Clay Cameronformer Australian Rules Footballer for the Gold Coast Football Club
 Helen DarvilleAustralian author and columnist
 Hon. Mick De BrenniState Member for Springwood, Minister for Housing and Public Works
 Timothy DelportSir John Monash Scholar 2017
 David Giffinformer Wallabies vice-captain
 Matthew KeithAustralian Farmer of the Year 2016
 Claire SmallQantas 2015 Australian Woman of the Year in the UK
 Lee Spurrformer Australian Rules footballer for the Fremantle Football Club)
 Andrew TrotterRhodes Scholar)

See also
List of schools in Queensland

References

External links
Redeemer Lutheran College website

Lutheran schools in Australia
Private secondary schools in Brisbane
Educational institutions established in 1981
Junior School Heads Association of Australia Member Schools
1981 establishments in Australia
The Associated Schools member schools
High schools and secondary schools affiliated with the Lutheran Church
Private primary schools in Brisbane
Elementary and primary schools affiliated with the Lutheran Church